Rudy C. Owens (born December 18, 1987) is an American former professional baseball pitcher. In 2014, he played for the Houston Astros in Major League Baseball (MLB).

Career
Owens attended Mesa High School in Mesa, Arizona, where he played for the school's baseball team.

Pittsburgh Pirates
The Pittsburgh Pirates drafted Owens out of Mesa in the 28th round (830th overall) of the 2006 Major League Baseball Draft. After attending Chandler-Gilbert Community College for the 2007 college baseball season, he signed with the Pirates as a draft-and-follow prospect.

In 2009, Owens was named a Class-A All-Star, South Atlantic League (SAL) All-Star, and SAL Most Outstanding Pitcher after going 10-1 with a 1.70 ERA in 19 games. He was also named the Pittsburgh Pirates' Minor League Pitcher of the Year. In 2010, Owens was named an Eastern League All-Star and was again named the Pirates' Minor League Pitcher of the Year. The Pirates added him to their 40 man roster after the 2011 season to protect him from the Rule 5 draft.

Houston Astros
On July 24, 2012, he was traded, along with Robbie Grossman and Colton Cain, to the Astros for Wandy Rodríguez. He spent the rest of the 2012 season with the Oklahoma City RedHawks, the Astros' AAA affiliate, and remained with the team through 2013.

On May 23, 2014, the Astros recalled Owens from AAA Oklahoma City to make his Major League debut against the Seattle Mariners.

Owens was outrighted off the Astros roster on October 9, 2014.

Oakland Athletics
Owens signed a minor league deal with the Oakland Athletics in November 2014

Los Angeles Dodgers
Owens was traded to the Los Angeles Dodgers on April 4, 2015. He pitched in 11 games across three levels for the Dodgers organization and was 0–4 with a 3.89 ERA. The Dodgers released him on July 16, 2015.

Colorado Rockies
Owens signed a minor league deal with the Colorado Rockies on July 25, 2015.

Somerset Patriots
On June 15, 2016, Owens signed with the Somerset Patriots of the Atlantic League of Professional Baseball.

Fortitudo Baseball Bologna
On May 8, 2017, Owens signed with the Fortitudo Baseball Bologna of the Italian Baseball League.

References

External links

1987 births
Living people
Sportspeople from Mesa, Arizona
Baseball players from Arizona
Major League Baseball pitchers
Houston Astros players
Chandler–Gilbert Coyotes baseball players
Gulf Coast Pirates players
State College Spikes players
West Virginia Power players
Lynchburg Hillcats players
Altoona Curve players
Indianapolis Indians players
Oklahoma City RedHawks players
Gigantes del Cibao players
American expatriate baseball players in the Dominican Republic
Oklahoma City Dodgers players
Rancho Cucamonga Quakes players
Tulsa Drillers players
Albuquerque Isotopes players
Somerset Patriots players
Mesa High School alumni
Toros del Este players
American expatriate baseball players in Italy
Fortitudo Baseball Bologna players